Joseph John Morrow  is the current Lord Lyon King of Arms. He was appointed to the office on 17 January 2014 and sworn in before the Lord President of the Court of Session on 27 February 2014.

Biography

Morrow is a member of the Faculty of Advocates and was named as King's Counsel in September 2015. In 2008 he was appointed President of the Mental Health Tribunal for Scotland (demitted office October 2019). He has previously served as Her Majesty's Commissioner for the Mental Welfare Commission for Scotland (1999–2006), as a First-Tier Tribunal Judge (Immigration and Asylum Chamber) (2002–2013), and as President of the Additional Support Needs Tribunals for Scotland (2010–2014).

In 2009, he was appointed as Vice Lord Lieutenant of the City of Dundee, having served as a Labour councillor for the Maryfield ward until that year.  He held the positions of Convenor of the Economic Development Committee, Convenor of the Dundee Waterfront Development Board, and was Depute Lord Provost during his time as an elected member.

He has served as incumbent of the Chapel of Glamis Castle, Chancellor of the Diocese of Brechin, and an Honorary Canon of St Paul's Cathedral, Dundee.

He is a Freemason and from 2004 to 2005 he served as the 108th Grand Master Mason of the Grand Lodge of Scotland. In March 2018 he was appointed as the First Grand Principal of the Supreme Grand Royal Arch Chapter of Scotland.

In 2012, he was appointed Commander of the Venerable Order of St John. In December 2015 he was promoted to the rank of Knight. In 2016 he was awarded an Honorary Doctorate of Laws by Edinburgh Napier University.

In 2020, he was appointed Squadron Colonel of 2 (City of Dundee and Highland) Signal Squadron, which is a sub unit of 32nd Signal Regiment, a Royal Signals Army Reserve sub-unit based in Dundee and Aberdeen.

His interests include ecclesiastical history and the practical application of ceremonial to state, civil, military, and ecclesiastical areas of Scottish life, together with over thirty years' experience in the field of heraldry.

Arms

See also
 List of Grand Master Masons of the Grand Lodge of Scotland

References

External links
Profile, heraldry-scotland.co.uk 
Profile, lyon-court.com

Living people
Commanders of the Order of the British Empire
Commanders of the Order of St John
Councillors in Dundee
Fellows of the Royal Society of Edinburgh
Lord Lyon Kings of Arms
Scottish Episcopalian priests
Scottish Freemasons
Scottish lawyers
Scottish officers of arms
Scottish King's Counsel
Year of birth missing (living people)